James Adger "Jack" Forsythe Jr. (August 4, 1882 – April 3, 1957), nicknamed "Pee Wee" Forsythe, was an American college football player and coach.  Forsythe has an important place in the history of college athletics in the U.S. state of Florida as the first head coach of the team now known as the University of Florida Gators.  He had previously been the last football coach at Florida State College, now Florida State University, before it was reorganized as a school for women.

Early years
Forsythe was born in Brevard, North Carolina. He claimed to have been at the first instance of the "Big Thursday" Clemson–South Carolina rivalry in Columbia, South Carolina in 1896.

College playing career 

Forsythe was a standout football player at right guard for Clemson Agricultural College (now Clemson University) in Clemson, South Carolina, playing for three years under coach John Heisman, from 1901 to 1903.  Heisman's Clemson Tigers football teams finished 3–1–1, 6–1 and 4–1–1 during those seasons, claiming southern championships in the latter two, and Forsythe started in each of those games.  Moreover, he played every minute of those eighteen games, providing a remarkable example of athletic stamina and resilience.  As was typical in the early 1900s, Forsythe played both offense and defense. Teammates on the line included Vet Sitton, Hope Sadler, and O. L. Derrick.

Coaching career 

Forsythe became an assistant coach for the fledgling football team of Florida State College (now Florida State University) in 1903.  Florida State College's head coach, W. W. Hughes, planned to use Forsythe as a fullback in a game against the University of Florida in Lake City (one of the predecessor institutions of the modern University of Florida, previously known as Florida Agricultural College), creating a controversy between the teams.  For the 1904 season, the third and last for FSC's football team, Hughes transferred all coaching duties to Forsythe.  The reason for this is unknown, but Hughes, who was also a Latin professor, may have taken on increased academic duties.  Forsythe played on top of his coaching duties, and was probably paid.  Under Forsythe, the FSC football team defeated the University of Florida at Lake City, and after defeating Stetson College (now Stetson University), FSC was declared "champion of Florida" by The Florida Times-Union newspaper of Jacksonville.

In 1905 the Florida Legislature passed the Buckman Act, which reorganized higher education in Florida. The University of Florida in Lake City was merged with three other institutions to form the new "University of the State of Florida", a school for  men in Gainesville.  Florida State College became the Florida Female College, a school for  women, and a number of its former male students transferred to the new men's university.  With the ending of FSC's football program, Forsythe coached the University School for Boys prep team in Stone Mountain, Georgia for a year.

The University of the State of Florida opened in Gainesville in 1906, and in May, Forsythe was hired to be the school's first football coach and director of athletics. Forsythe coached at Florida for three seasons from 1906 to 1908, and he compiled a 14–6–2 overall win–loss record.  As measured by his winning percentage (.682), he is currently the eighth winningest football coach in team history.  In addition to his coaching duties for which he was paid $500, Forsythe also played on the team as a fullback and was purportedly paid an additional $500. Forsythe's most successful season at Florida came in 1907, when the Orange and Blue posted a 4–1–1 record behind star back William Shands, who later was elected as a state senator and helped found the University of Florida College of Medicine.

Head coaching record

See also
 History of Florida State University
 History of the University of Florida
 List of Clemson University alumni

References

Bibliography 

  2012 Florida Football Media Guide, University Athletic Association, Gainesville, Florida (2012).
 Carlson, Norm, University of Florida Football Vault: The History of the Florida Gators, Whitman Publishing, LLC, Atlanta, Georgia (2007).  .
 Golenbock, Peter, Go Gators!  An Oral History of Florida's Pursuit of Gridiron Glory, Legends Publishing, LLC, St. Petersburg, Florida (2002).  .
 Kabat, Ric A., "Before the Seminoles: Football at Florida State College, 1902–1904," Florida Historical Quarterly, vol. LXX, no. 1 (July 1991).
 McCarthy, Kevin M.,  Fightin' Gators: A History of University of Florida Football, Arcadia Publishing, Mount Pleasant, South Carolina (2000).  .
 McEwen, Tom, The Gators: A Story of Florida Football, The Strode Publishers, Huntsville, Alabama (1974).  .
 Nash, Noel, ed., The Gainesville Sun Presents The Greatest Moments in Florida Gators Football, Sports Publishing, Inc., Champaign, Illinois (1998).  .
 Proctor, Samuel, & Wright Langley, Gator History: A Pictorial History of the University of Florida, South Star Publishing Company, Gainesville, Florida (1986).  .

External links
 

1882 births
1957 deaths
American football guards
Clemson Tigers football players
Florida Gators athletic directors
Florida Gators football coaches
Florida State Seminoles football coaches
People from Brevard, North Carolina
Players of American football from North Carolina